El Puntero is a 2011 Argentine miniseries, produced by Pol-Ka and starred by Julio Chávez and Gabriela Toscano. "Puntero" is a word from Argentine slang for a man who works as an intermediate between poor people and political parties, in a clientelist relation (that is, a political broker). The miniseries received the Golden Martín Fierro Award.

Production
El puntero is a political drama set in an Argentine Villa miseria. It is produced by Pol-Ka for the TV channel El Trece. Although El Trece is part of the Grupo Clarín, which had several conflicts with the government of Cristina Kirchner, the lead actor Julio Chávez clarified that the tone of the miniseries is generic, and not a criticism of the Kirchner's administration. In fact, he conditioned his work in the program on the absence of specific political bias. Chávez did not even know about political clientelism, and investigated about the topic before accepting to work in the program.

The opening of the program uses the song "Fuego" by Bomba Estéreo, and mixes images of the history of Argentina with images of Chávez characterized as a political puntero. For this purpose he grew his sideburns, used hair extensions, 1970s shirts and chains.

The program did not have a fixed filming set, and filmed scenes at several real villa miserias.

Plot
The miniseries is set in a Villa miseria in Greater Buenos Aires, ruled by mayor Iñíguez since 1987. Pablo Aldo Perotti, known as the "Gitano", works in the clientelist relation between the poor people and the political authorities. Perotti wants to be the new mayor, and to return with his former wife Clarita.

At the end of the miniseries, Clarita becomes the new mayor, and Perotti ends up in a psychiatric institution

Reception
The program won the 2011 Martín Fierro Awards for best miniseries actor (Julio Chávez) and best miniseries. They received as well the Golden Martín Fierro Award.

Cast
 Julio Chávez as Pablo Aldo Gitano Perotti
 Gabriela Toscano as Clarita
 Luis Luque as Levan Levante Ufaloff
 Rodrigo de la Serna as José María Lombardo
 María Rosa Fugazot as Antonia
 Carlos Moreno as Hugo Iñíguez
 Belén Blanco as Libertad
 Pablo Brichta as Leme Ufaloff
 Joaquín Flamini as Francisquito
 Fernando Locatelli as Loiro 
 Bárbara Lombardo as La Pochi
 Claudio Rissi as Filpi
 Ariel Staltari as Luis Calda
 Nahuel Pérez Biscayart as Herminio

References

External links
 

Political drama television series
Golden Martín Fierro Award winners
Pol-ka telenovelas
2011 Argentine television series debuts
2011 Argentine television series endings
Television shows set in Buenos Aires
Spanish-language television shows
2010s Argentine drama television series